SmartPOST is an Estonian logistics company which specializes in delivery of goods and self-servicing post offices. Founded in 2008, SmartPOST currently operates 46 self-servicing post offices over Estonia through a solution called Delivery Point Solution (DPS).

Currently, the DPS system is used by online shops for product delivery as an alternative to regular post services. Private customers can send their packages through the system as well and pay for the delivery on the spot with a debit or credit card. The system also encompasses an SMS-based notification system, notifying clients when an item has been delivered. SmartPOST's solution was implemented in April 2009.

Unlike other similar systems (such as the Packstation solution in Germany), SmartPOST has placed its Delivery Point Solution indoors (e.g. in shopping malls), making them convenient to use even with bad weather. In July 2009, SmartPOST reported it was in negotiations with an Italian company interested in licensing SmartPOST's Delivery Point Solution for usage in Italy.

Currently, SmartPOST is servicing roughly two hundred distant selling companies and online shops in Estonia.

During its first year of operation, SmartPOST reported a 13.8 million EEK (about 1.2 million USD) turnover with an 8.3 million ($740,000 USD) profit loss. SmartPOST's member of board Antti Oolup said that the loss was expected and planned, with monthly profits planned for the end of 2009. SmartPOST reported that over 33 thousand packages were sent through its service in Estonia in December 2009.

SmartPOST was chosen as the Logistics Deed 2009 at the annual Purchase Management and Logistics Conference. At the end of 2009, SmartPOST also reported that it will expand its business to Finland. Currently, only one-way packages can be sent from Estonia.

In November 2010, SmartPOST's CEO position was taken over from Indrek Oolup by Risto Eelmaa.

Controversy regarding advertising 
In October 2009, Estonia's national postal company Eesti Post filed a complaint with the Estonian Consumer Union, claiming that SmartPOST's television advertisements were damaging the reputation of Eesti Post and also "calling viewers up to violence against elderly people". SmartPOST responded that the claim was untrue and damaging reputation or calls for violence were not their intention.

Sale to Itella Corporation 

In July 2010, the Estonian Development Fund (majority shareholder in SmartPOST) sold its share to the Finnish postal service and logistics company Itella. Raivo Vare, Head of the Estonian Development Fund commented on the sale, saying: "Risk investment is a field where there are few success stories, but SmartPOST is definitely one of them. Sale of SmartPOST is even better than it looks." The Estonian Development Fund reportedly earned €1.3 million from the sale of SmartPOST.

Production and intellectual rights for the Delivery Point Solution remains in the hands of Cleveron, a separate entity from SmartPOST.

References

External links 
 SmartPOST's controversial television advertisement

Logistics companies of Estonia
2006 establishments in Estonia